Berceni Stadium is a football stadium in Berceni, Romania. The stadium holds 2,700 people.

The home was the ground of second division side ACS Berceni until 2016, the Stadionul Berceni stage three group matches at the 2011 UEFA European Under-19 Football Championship.

References

Football venues in Romania